O-2545 is an analgesic cannabinoid derivative created by Organix Inc. for use in scientific research. Unlike most cannabinoids discovered to date, it is water-soluble, which gives it considerable advantages over many related cannabinoids. It has high affinity for both CB1 and CB2 receptors, with Ki values of 1.5 nM at CB1 and 0.32 nM at CB2.

See also
 O-2113
 O-2372
 Tropoxane

References

Cannabinoids
Benzochromenes
Phenols
Imidazoles